Various organizations operate vessels they refer to as Polar-class icebreakers:

 Polar Class, a set of specification from the International Association of Classification Societies (IACS)
 United States Coast Guard operates two Polar-class icebreakers
 CCGS John G. Diefenbaker was originally called "CCG Polar Class icebreaker" ice breaker program for the Canadian Coast Guard
 The Polar 8 Project, cancelled plans to build a "Polar-class icebreaker" for the Canadian Coast Guard
 United States Coast Guard Polar Security Cutter program, frequently called the Polar icebreaker program.